The Pennsylvania State Board of Censors was an organization under the Pennsylvania Department of Education responsible for approving, redacting, or banning motion pictures that it considered "sacrilegious, obscene, indecent, or immoral" or might pervert morals.

Organization 
The board was composed of three members, which were appointed by the Governor of Pennsylvania.  Despite a censorship law passed in 1911, a lack of funding prevented it from beginning its activities until 1914.

Elimination 
In 1956, the Supreme Court of Pennsylvania ruled the act which created and provided for the board was unconstitutional, with respect to the Pennsylvania Constitution and so revoked the mandate for the board's existence. The Pennsylvania General Assembly re-enacted the statute in 1959, but it was struck down again in 1961 by the Pennsylvania Supreme Court.

See also 
 British Board of Film Censors
 Film censorship in the United States
 Indian Film Censor Board
 List of Pennsylvania state agencies
 Maryland State Board of Censors

References

External links 
 Page on the Department of Education from the State Archives
 The Public Domain film which the above image came from

State agencies of Pennsylvania
Government of Pennsylvania
Film censorship in the United States
1911 establishments in Pennsylvania
1956 disestablishments in Pennsylvania
1959 establishments in Pennsylvania
1961 disestablishments in Pennsylvania